In re Caremark International Inc. Derivative Litigation, 698 A.2d 959 (Del. Ch. 1996), is a civil action that came before the Delaware Court of Chancery. It is an important case in United States corporate law and discusses a director's duty of care in the oversight context. It raised the question regarding compliance, "what is the board's responsibility with respect to the organization and monitoring of the enterprise to assure that the corporation functions within the law to achieve its purposes?" Chancellor Allen wrote the opinion.

Facts
The shareholders of Caremark International, Inc. brought a derivative action, alleging the directors breached their duty of care by failing to put in place adequate internal control systems. This in turn was said to enable the company's employees to commit criminal offences, resulting in substantial fines and civil penalties amounting to over $250 million.

Judgment
The settlement contract requiring stricter oversight of corporate employees was approved. Chancellor Allen noted that most company decisions do not need director supervision. "Legally, the board itself will be required only to authorize the most significant corporate acts or transactions: mergers, changes in capital structure, fundamental changes in business, appointment and compensation of the CEO, etc."

He pointed to Graham v. Allis-Chalmers Mfg. Co., where the company violated antitrust law, without the directors knowing what the employees had done. But the court rejected that the directors ought to have known, because 'absent cause for suspicion there is no duty upon the directors to install and operate a corporate system of espionage to ferret out wrongdoing which they have no reason to suspect exists.' There were no grounds for suspicion here. He said this means that boards do no wrong 'simply for assuming the integrity of employees and the honesty of their dealings.'

But, since Smith v. Van Gorkom, it was clear that 'relevant and timely information is an essential predicate for satisfaction of the board's supervisory and monitoring role under s 141 of the DGCL.' Directors must be 'assuring themselves that information and reporting systems exist in the organization that are reasonably designed to provide senior management and to the board itself timely, accurate information sufficient to allow management and the board, each within its scope, to reach informed judgments concerning both the corporation's compliance with law and its business performance.' The level of detail for any such system is a business judgment matter. But failure to have some reasonable system may 'render a director liable for losses caused by non-compliance with applicable legal standards.'

A director's obligation includes a duty to attempt in good faith to assure that a corporate information and reporting system, which the board concludes is adequate, exists, and that failure to do so under some circumstances may, in theory at least, render a director liable for losses.

Significance
The court went on to define a multi-factor test designed to determine when this duty of care is breached. To show that directors breached their oversight duty (a duty later held to fall under the broader category of the duty of loyalty), plaintiffs must show that:  
 The directors knew OR should have known that violations of the law were occurring, and in either event
 The directors took no steps in a good faith effort to prevent or remedy the situation, and
 Such failure proximately resulted in the losses complained of (though this last element may be thought to constitute an affirmative defense).

Caremark is most widely known and cited for this expanded vision of the duty of oversight. Because of this holding, corporations strengthened their compliance programs.

In Marchand v. Barnhill et al., No. 533, 2018 (Del. June 19, 2019), in which the Delaware Supreme Court reversed a lower court’s dismissal of a stockholder lawsuit against the members of the board of directors and two officers of Blue Bell Creameries, the court’s Chief Justice Strine wrote the court’s unanimous opinion that the justices hold the board of directors “failed to implement any system to monitor Blue Bell’s food safety performance or compliance and applied the “duty to monitor” doctrine enunciated the In re Caremark Int’l Inc. Derivative Litig., 698 A.2d 959, 971 (Del. Ch.1996).  Chief Justice Strine quoted Caremark, in adding that “A board’s “utter failure to attempt to assure a reasonable information and reporting system exists” is an act of bad faith in breach of the duty of loyalty.”

See also

US corporate law
Re Barings plc (No 5) [1999] 1 BCLC 433

References

External links
 

Delaware state case law
United States corporate case law
1996 in United States case law
1996 in Delaware